Qualification for the 2004 Little League World Series took place in sixteen different parts of the world during July and August 2004, with formats and number of teams varying by region.

United States

Great Lakes

The tournament took place in Indianapolis, Indiana from July 31 to August 9.

Mid-Atlantic Region

The tournament took place in Bristol, Connecticut from August 6–15.

Midwest

The tournament took place in Indianapolis, Indiana from July 31-August 9.

New England

The tournament was held in Bristol, Connecticut from August 6–15.

Northwest

The tournament was held in San Bernardino, California from August 1–12

Southeast

The tournament took place in St. Petersburg, Florida from August 1–7.

Southwest

The tournament took place in Waco, Texas from August 5–10.

West

The tournament took place in San Bernardino from August 1–12.

International

Asia

The tournament took place in Hagåtña, Guam from July 23–28.

Canada

The tournament was held in Brossard, Quebec from August 7–14.

Caribbean

The tournament took place in Oranjestad, Aruba from July 18–24.

Europe, Middle East and Africa

The tournament took place in Kutno, Poland from July 26-August 2.

Latin America

The tournament took place in Panama City, Panama from July 25–31

Mexico

The tournament took place in Monterrey, Nuevo León from July 3–12.

Phase 1

Phase 2

Pacific

The tournament took place in Hagåtña, Guam from July 23–29.

Transatlantic

The tournament was held in Kutno, Poland from August 5–14.

External links
2004 Little League World Series website

2004 Little League World Series